Ogbunabali is the traditional Igbo death deity. His name is considered to be a literal description of his character as he is said to kill his victims in the night, these usually being criminals or those who have committed an unspeakable taboo.

References

Igbo gods
African gods
Death gods

ig:Ogbunabali